A phrase is a group of words that functions as a single constituent in the sentence.

Phrase may also refer to:
Phrase (music), a unit of musical meter
Phrase (fencing), a sequence of actions in fencing
Phrase (rapper), Australian rapper
Phrase (software), translation management system for software